Traitor's Blade is a 2014 swashbuckling novel by Canadian author Sebastien de Castell. It is the first book in de Castell's "Greatcoats" series, which follows the adventures and misfortunes of the titular Greatcoats, the remnants of an ancient order of travelling magistrates and duelists. The second book, titled  Knight's Shadow, was published later in 2014, while the third, titled Saint's Blood, was released in 2016. The fourth book, Tyrant's Throne, was released in 2017.

The series revolves around three Greatcoats: Falcio val Mond, the nominal leader of the order and the story's narrator; Falcio's childhood friend Kest Murrowson, a master swordsman; and Brasti Goodbow, an archer of unparalleled skill but with a troubled past. Together, they navigate the political intrigue of the kingdom of Tristia while attempting to fulfill the final orders of King Paelis, deposed and murdered by Tristia's dukes some time before the series begins.

The book is written in a style reminiscent of The Three Musketeers, making use of action and adventure elements that take place against a backdrop of political upheaval. Long before the events of the series, the Greatcoats (named for their iconic garment, a heavy leather coat that provides protection from the elements, storage for myriad items, and even light armor in battle, aside from serving as a uniform) were a respected order. They travelled throughout Tristia, empowered by the king to safeguard the rule of law through a combination of legal scholarship, skillful mediation, and, when necessary, armed combat. At the opening of "Traitor's Blade", however, the king has been assassinated and the Greatcoats have fallen into ill regard-- "tattercoats" distrusted and scorned as traitors by the very people they once served. Falcio and his companions wander without aim, trying in vain to follow the vague, secretive final orders given to them by their deceased King, while the Dukes maneuver for ever more power. But when their web of conspiracies threatens a strange little girl with a familiar name, Falcio swears to defend her, no matter the cost.

The author, Sebastien De Castell, is from Vancouver, British Columbia.

References

2014 Canadian novels
Canadian adventure novels
Canadian fantasy novels
Jo Fletcher Books books